The Human Condition is the debut studio album by American singer-songwriter Jon Bellion. The album was released on June 10, 2016, through Visionary Music Group and Capitol Records. It was supported by four promotional singles: "Guillotine", "All Time Low", "80's Films", and "Maybe IDK". "All Time Low" was later announced as the lead single from the album and was released on May 13, 2016. Bellion released early versions of "All Time Low" and "Woke the Fuck Up" in 2015 along with the song "Woodstock (Psychedelic Fiction)", which did not feature on the record. "Overwhelming" was released as a single on April 25, 2017.

Artwork 
The cover art for The Human Condition was created by David Ardinaryas Lojaya and Jacob Caljouw. Additionally, Lojaya and Caljouw created artwork for each of the tracks on the album. The recurrent themes throughout the fourteen pieces are "...young Jon, current Jon, and the old Jon [as well as] a woman who is throughout all the things, and she should be muse..".

Singles
"Guillotine", "80's Films", and "Maybe IDK" were released as promotional singles in early 2016.

"All Time Low" was released to digital retailers on May 13, 2016, and later to Top 40 radio on August 30, 2016, as the lead single from the album.

"Overwhelming" was announced to be the second official single from the album, and was released to Top 40 radio on April 25, 2017.

Track listing

Notes
  signifies an additional (non-primary) producer

Personnel
Musicians

 Jon Bellion – vocals (all tracks), background vocals (track 1), drum programming (1, 2, 6, 8, 10, 12, 13), keyboards (1, 3, 8–10, 12–14)
 Mark Williams – drum programming (1, 6, 12, 14), keyboards (1, 2, 6, 9, 11–14), acoustic guitar (2, 13, 14), electric guitar (2, 4, 14), bass guitar (8, 13), piano (8)
 Audra Mae – background vocals (1)
 Travis Mendes – background vocals (1, 3, 13, 14)
 Alec Benjamin – background vocals (4)
 Mylon Hayde – drum programming (4, 12), keyboards (4)
 Paul Bushnell – bass guitar (5)
 Vanessa Freebairn-Smith – cello (5)
 Jay Paul Bicknell – drum programming (5)
 Stephan Moccio – keyboards, piano (5)
 Fraser T. Smith – acoustic guitar, keyboards (6)
 Raul Cubina – drum programming (6, 12)
 Chris DeStefano – acoustic guitar, vocals (9)
 Illmind – drum programming, keyboards (9)
 Hakim Hardy – vocals (9)
 Kimberly Perry – background vocals (10)
 Samuel Martin – background vocals (11)
 Sean Douglas – background vocals (11)
 Ian Kirkpatrick – guitar, keyboards (11)
 Jason Evigan – guitar, keyboards (11)
 Alfie Silas Durio – additional vocals (14)
 Alvin Chea – additional vocals (14)
 Anjolee Williams – additional vocals (14)
 Annette Mata – additional vocals (14)
 Bill Cantos – additional vocals (14)
 Carmel Echols – additional vocals (14)
 Eyvonne Williams – additional vocals (14)
 Jamie McCrary – additional vocals (14)
 Jason Morales – additional vocals (14)
 Kurt Lykes – additional vocals (14)
 Linda McCrary – additional vocals (14)
 Lisa Stone – additional vocals (14)
 Melodye Perry – additional vocals (14)
 Michiko Hill – additional vocals (14)
 Pattie Howard – additional vocals (14)
 Perry Morgan – additional vocals (14)
 Rick Nelson – additional vocals (14)
 Sam McCrary – additional vocals (14)
 Terri Ivens – additional vocals (14)
 Voncile Faggett – additional vocals (14)

Technical
 Manny Marroquin – mixing (1, 6, 8–14)
 Mark Williams – mixing (2–4, 7), engineering (1, 2, 4, 8–10, 12, 13), mixing assistance (14)
 Volta – mixing (2–4), mixing assistance (14)
 Sean Tallman – mixing (5)
 Jon Bellion – mixing (7), engineering (1–4, 7–10, 12–14)
 Raul Cubina – engineering (1, 8–10, 12, 13)
 Mylon Hayde – engineering (4)
 Jay Paul Bicknell – engineering (5)
 Fraser T. Smith – engineering (6)
 Matthew Emonson – engineering (6)
 Jonathan Simpson – engineering (8)
 Bradford Smith – engineering (11)
 Chandler Harrod – engineering (14)
 Chris Galland – mixing assistance (1, 6, 8–14)
 Ike Shultz – mixing assistance (1, 6, 8–14)
 Jon Schacter – engineering assistance (11)

The Human Condition Tour 
On April 27, 2016, two days after the album was announced, Bellion revealed the dates of Part 1 of The Human Condition Tour. Later, Bellion revealed Part 2 and the European Leg on July 26, 2016 and September 29, 2016, respectively.

Commercial performance

In the United States, The Human Condition debuted at number 5 on the Billboard 200, with 40,000 equivalent album units, marking the second highest debut of the week. It was the fourth best-selling album of the week, selling 32,000 copies in its first week. On September 7, 2017, the album was certified gold by the Recording Industry Association of America (RIAA) for combined sales and album-equivalent units of over 500,000 units in the United States. "Woke the F*ck Up" was certified gold, also by the RIAA, in December 2018.

Charts

Weekly charts

Year-end charts

Certifications

References

2016 debut albums
Capitol Records albums
Jon Bellion albums
Albums produced by Jon Bellion
Albums produced by Jason Evigan